Kozuki or Kōzuki may refer to:

Places
Kōzuki, Hyōgo, town located in Sayō District, Hyōgo, Japan
Kōzuki Station, train station in Sayō, Sayō District, Hyōgo Prefecture, Japan
10368 Kozuki, a main-belt asteroid

People with the surname
Asako Kozuki, Japanese American voice actress
, Japanese footballer
Wataru Kozuki (born 1971), Japanese performing artist and a former member of the Takarazuka Revue

See also
Siege of Kōzuki (1578) when the army of Mōri Terumoto attacked and captured the castle of Kōzuki in Harima Province

Japanese-language surnames